Ahlquist is a surname. Notable people with the surname include:

Jon Edward Ahlquist (1944–2020), American molecular biologist and ornithologist
Lloyd Ahlquist (born 1977), American comedian/musician
Raymond P. Ahlquist (1914–1983), American pharmacist and pharmacologist

See also
Ahlquist v. Cranston
Ahlqvist